Öjeby IF is a sports club in Öjebyn in Piteå, Sweden, established on 2 November 1922. The women's soccer team played in the Swedish top division in 1978.

References

External links
Official website 

1922 establishments in Sweden
Football clubs in Norrbotten County
Swedish handball clubs
Ice hockey teams in Sweden
Sports clubs established in 1922
Piteå
Ice hockey teams in Norrbotten County
Ski clubs in Sweden
Multi-sport clubs in Sweden